Crime in New Zealand encompasses criminal law, crime statistics, the nature and characteristics of crime, sentencing, punishment, and public perceptions of crime. New Zealand criminal law has its origins in English criminal law, which was codified into statute by the New Zealand parliament in 1893. Although New Zealand remains a common law jurisdiction, all criminal offences and their penalties are codified in New Zealand statutes.

Criminal justice system

Criminal Law

Criminal law in New Zealand is based on English criminal law that the New Zealand parliament initially codified in statute in 1893. Although New Zealand remains a common law jurisdiction, all criminal offences and their penalties are codified in New Zealand statutes.

Most criminal offences that would result in imprisonment in New Zealand are set out in the Crimes Act 1961 and its amendments. Criminal offences related to specific situations also appear in other legislation, such as the Misuse of Drugs Act 1975 for drug offences and the Land Transport Act 1998 for traffic offences. Less serious breaches of the law are dealt with under legislation such as the Summary Offences Act 1981, where penalties are more often a fine or other community sanctions rather than imprisonment.

The age of criminal responsibility in New Zealand is 10 years; however, children aged 10 and 11 can only be convicted of murder and manslaughter, while children aged 12 and 13 can only be convicted of a crime with a maximum sentence of 14 years or more imprisonment.

Enforcement
The primary enforcement agency is the New Zealand Police, however more specialised crimes are enforced by other agencies such as the Serious Fraud Office, Ministry for Primary Industries, Immigration New Zealand and the New Zealand Customs Service among others. Local councils and other individuals appointed by the Police Commissioner also have the power to enforce laws and bylaws. The enforcement agency may charge an individual accused of breaking the law by filing a charging document with the registry of a district court.

Adult Diversion Scheme 
First offenders charged with minor crimes and accepting full responsibility of their actions are considered for the New Zealand Police Adult Diversion Scheme. Given offenders agree to the conditions of diversion (which usually involves a written agreement tailored to change the offending behaviour), the offender may have the charge withdrawn.

Family Group Conferences 
Family Group Conferences (FGC) are a type of statutory forum for youth offenders in which a child or young person, the victim of an alleged offence, family, whānau, hapū, iwi and supporters, and state and community representatives meet to decide how to best respond to the offending behaviour. FGCs may be invoked in a variety of scenarios including when the police has the intention to charge a child or a young person, when a child or young person is appearing before a court and does not deny the charge, following a prosecution in which the child is found guilty and in other specialised cases.

Arraignment and trial 
Following the filing of charges, an arraignment will be held in the District Court. The severity of the offence and the age of the accused will determine the trial court, whether the trial is by jury or by a judge alone. Children and adolescents aged 17 and under are usually tried by the youth justice sector, but serious cases may be transferred to the adult justice sector.

The severity of an offence is define by the Criminal Procedures Act 2011 as described below:

A category 1 offence is an offence punishable by a fine, such as leaving a child without reasonable supervision or care. Trials are heard in the District Court before a judge alone.
A category 2 offence is an offence punishable by a community sentence or imprisonment of less than two years, such as vandalism and common assault. Trials are heard in the District Court before a judge alone.
A category 3 offence is an offence punishable by imprisonment of two years or more that is not a Category 4 offence, such as theft and indecent assault. Cases are usually heard in the District Court, and defendants may opt for a jury trial or a judge-alone trial. Serious offences (e.g. kidnapping, sexual violation of a child) may be transferred to the High Court at the request of the prosecution or defendant.
A category 4 offence is an offence listed in Schedule 1 of the Act, including murder, manslaughter, treason, terrorism, aircraft hijacking, and nuclear weapon offences. Cases are heard in the High Court before a judge and jury (although a judge-only trial can be ordered in exceptional circumstances).

Sentencing 
There are numerous types of sentences which judges may impose on those found guilty of an offence. The type of sentence imposed typically depends on the severity of the crime. In order of decreasing severity, judges may impose: imprisonment, home detention, community detention, intensive supervision, supervision, community work, fines, convict and discharge, and discharge without conviction.

Life imprisonment

Life imprisonment is the severest form of punishment in New Zealand since the abolition of the death penalty in 1989. It is the mandatory sentence for treason, the presumptive sentence for murder, and an optional sentence for terrorism, manslaughter and certain drug-related offences. People sentenced to life imprisonment remain in prison or on parole for the remainder of their life.

Most people sentenced to life imprisonment can apply for parole after a minimum non-parole period set by the sentencing judge. The default minimum non-parole period for murder is 10 years, increasing to 17 years for aggravated murders. The option of life imprisonment without the possibility of parole was added in 2010. The only person to have been sentenced to life imprisonment without parole is the perpetrator of the Christchurch mosque shootings in March 2019.

Correctional facilities (prisons)

Prison sentences are administered by the Department of Corrections in correctional facilities. As of August 2015, New Zealand has 18 correctional facilities, 15 for male prisoners located from Kaikohe to Invercargill, and three for female prisoners located in the main centres of Auckland, Wellington and Christchurch.

Crime statistics

Crime-related statistics are publicly available from the New Zealand Police's policedata.nz website, which is updated monthly. Police also regularly release media statements and other information to inform the public about crime.

Standards 
Statistics New Zealand sets standards for collecting crime data, and collates statistical data from the Police, Department of Corrections and Ministry of Justice. Each department also publicly publishes their own statistical data. Since 1 July 2010, the entire justice sector has used the Australian and New Zealand Standard Offence Classification (ANZSOC) to classify and aggregate offence, offender and conviction statistics.

Reporting of crime 
Many crimes, especially sexual crimes and violence, go unreported and consequently do not appear in official statistics. The Salvation Army's 2019 State of the Nation Report observes there is a lack of reliable data about criminal offending, particularly for domestic violence. Statistics reported in headlines that previously indicated that crime rates were rising or falling do not reflect reality because most crime is not reported to police and a lot of crime that is reported does not appear in statistics that police produce. Factors like the level of public confidence in the police and changes in media reporting may also have an effect on the reporting of crime.

The Ministry of Justice has conducted Crime and Safety Surveys (NZCASS) in 2006, 2009 and 2014 to assess victimisation rates as well as other research about crime in New Zealand.  Victim surveys tend to suggest that less than a third of 'crime' is actually reported to police, which is consistent with victimisation surveys in similar countries such as Australia, Britain and the United States. However, victim surveys also include reports of relatively minor matters which would not necessarily be seen as crimes by the justice system so interpretation of the figures is difficult. The Crime and Victims Survey (CVS) which replaced the NZCASS surveys in 2018, estimates that a quarter of crime was reported to the Police between October 2018 and October 2019. Under reporting was more prevalent for personal offences and sexual assaults in particular, with an estimated 94% of sexual assaults in that year not reported.

Recording of crime 
Changes in the legal definition of an offense, the resourcing of the police, methods of counting and police practices have affected the recorded levels of crime. Two examples of changes which have had a statistically significant effect on the recorded crime include a new crime measurement series introduced in 1996 and a change of the computer crime recording system in June 2005.

Resolution of cases 
Between 1998 and 2014 the police became more effective at resolving crimes such that the resolution rate has gone from about 36% of all reported crimes to nearly 50%. The trend has not continued and in 2012 the number of cases resolved dropped to 47%. For serious violence the resolution rate is 72% and the murder resolution rate has gone from 62% to 85%.

Crime rates

20th Century 
Despite different means of measuring crime, the statistics show that the reported crime rates in New Zealand were low for the first half of the 20th century - but rose steeply from 1950, peaking in 1992, and has steadily declined since then. A similar pattern is seen in other Western countries. Individual offence categories show a more mixed picture.

21st Century 
The crime rate has continued to decline in the twenty-first century. In 2010, the number of murders fell by about 25% from the previous year. Reported crimes have generally become 6.7 percent less frequent. In 2011, New Zealand's recorded crime rate was at its lowest in 15 years, down another 5.6% on the figures from 2010. In 2012 (financial year), the crime rate dropped another 5.9 per cent on the previous year – taking into account an increase in the population of 0.7%. Homicide and related offending dropped by 21.5%.

The total number of offences in 2012 was the lowest since 1989, and gave the lowest crime rate per head of population since before electronic records were maintained. Police said the largest decrease was in Canterbury, where recorded crime fell by over 11% – due to a large decrease in recorded theft and property damage offences immediately after the Christchurch earthquakes. However, this doesn't necessarily mean crime actually dropped. Deputy Police Commissioner Viv Rickard said "This decrease appears to be partly due to the public not wanting to bother us with minor matters when they knew we were dealing with the earthquake.

For the 12 months ending 31 December 2018, New Zealand Police recorded 260,354 total victimisations, a decrease of 2.7% from the previous 12 months. Theft victimisations reduced by 0.8% compared with the previous 12 months. Burglary victimisations decreased by 6.8%, and assault victimisations decreased by 2%. Note that victimisations under-counts the true number of offences, as it does not count crimes where there is no identifiable victim (e.g. drug and public order offences).

Factors contributing to crime rate 
There has been much speculation about the causes of the decrease in crime rates. The impact of economic downturns, unemployment rates, local disasters, better security, changing demographic patterns, increased policing and various changes in the culture and life-style have all been examined. Collectively, all these factors may play a part.

Sir David Carruthers, a former Chief District Court Judge and now head of the Independent Police Conduct Authority, says the drop in the crime rate in New Zealand is partly due to a drive to reduce the number of teenagers being suspended or expelled from school. Around 70% of the most serious youth offenders are not in school, and keeping them involved in education is the best way to reduce offending.

Kim Workman of Rethinking Crime & Punishment says another factor is the changing demographic in society. Recent changes in police strategy have also reduced the number of prosecutions in the past two years. Police are using diversion and warnings more frequently instead of charging minor offenders and are issuing safety orders for less serious domestic situations – which allow an offender to be ordered out of the house for up to five days without recording this as an offence.

Types of crimes committed 
The New Zealand Crime and Safety Survey (NZCASS) estimated that in 2014, the four major classes of crime incidents were assault (27.3%), threat of force (21.4%), burglary (10.8%) and sexual offences (9.9%). Most of these incidents (52.9%) were experienced by a victim that experienced five or more incidents of crime.

According to the NZCASS survey, 10.4% of adults were the victim of interpersonal crime and 5.7% of adults were the victim of physical crimes while 2.1% of adults were the victims of sexual crime.

Intimate partner violence 
In 2014, 3% of adults were estimated to have been a victim of physical violence by an intimate partner while 1.2% were the victim of a sexual crime by an intimate partner.

Ram-raiding 
In 2022, a surge in ram-raiding attracted significant media and public attention. In April 2022, Police Assistant Commissioner Richard Chambers estimated that 88% of offenders involved in ram raids were below the age of 20 and that the majority were under 17 years old. One ram raiding case in Hamilton involved four children between the ages of 7 and 12 years. In July 2022, Radio New Zealand (RNZ) reported a 400% increase in ram raids over the past five years with 76% of those arrested being under the age of 18 years. 14% of these had connections to organised crime. According to youth worker Israel Meredith, youths involved in ram raids were influenced by social media, dysfunctional family backgrounds, lack of role models, and poverty. According to a police report cited by RNZ, goods were stolen in 81% of the ram raids with common items being cash, retail goods and cigarettes. 37% of the ram raids had resulted in Police enforcement action; with 61% being prosecuted and 39% being referred to youth agencies. Businesses targeted by ram raids have included high-end luxury chains such as Louis Vuitton and Gucci, jewellery stores, liquor stores, vape shops, dairies and restaurants.

Police Commissioner Andrew Coster expressed concern about Police having difficulty prosecuting young offenders due to their age. While Prime Minister Jacinda Ardern recognised the large number of offences committed by young ram raiders, she emphasised that the government preferred solutions that did not involve incarceration in order to reduce reoffending. The ACT Party's police spokesperson Chris Baillie advocated more intervention in the lives of troubled youths in order to reduce youth crime. On 30 August 2022, the Police secured NZ$6 million for the Small Retailer Crime Prevention Fund aimed at helping small businesses protect their stores from ram raids. The fund is intended to allow stores to procure protective equipment such as shatterproof glass, bollards, fog cannons, and roller doors.

Public perceptions of crime 

A Ministry of Justice study in 2003 found that 83% of New Zealanders held inaccurate and negative views about crime levels in society and 'wrongly believed' that crime was increasing. A more recent study in 2009 by Dr Michael Rowe, also from Victoria University, found "an overwhelming public belief that crime has got worse" despite New Zealand's murder rate dropping by almost half in the past 20 years. Reflecting the depth of these misperceptions, between 2006 and 2009, only 57% of New Zealanders reported feeling 'safe'.

In mid 2014, the Ministry of Justice and Colmar Brunton conducted a survey of 2,051 New Zealanders about their perceptions of crime and the criminal justice sector. They concluded:
Television, newspapers and online news sites were the most common sources of information about crime; they were also viewed as the most reliable sources.
There was a low level of perceived knowledge about the criminal justice system; knowledge was higher among agencies at the front end of the system (e.g. Police) and lower among those agencies at the back end (e.g. Parole Board).
Most respondents didn't think there was a crime problem in their neighbourhood or that local crime was increasing.
The majority of respondents thought that national crime was increasing, especially females aged 50–69, those with no qualifications or only high school qualifications, and those living outside the main cities.
Respondents identified a range of crime causes, with drugs/alcohol, poor parenting, unemployment, family breakdown, poverty and poor education being the most common.
Most respondents still had an inaccurate view of why most people are in prison; only 29 percent of respondents correctly identified violent and sexual crimes as the main reason for imprisonment, while 28 percent identified drug-related crimes.
The Police were viewed the most positively of all agencies in the criminal justice system.
The criminal courts tended to be viewed negatively.
The majority of respondents agreed than prisons kept the public safe by containing offenders, but other aspects of prisons, community sentences and the parole system tended to be viewed negatively
Under one-third of respondents were confident with the effectiveness of the criminal justice sector.
Respondents didn't identify one single course of action that would increase their confidence in the criminal justice system; suggestions included a mixture of preventative, process-orientated, rehabilitative, and to a lesser extent, more punitive responses.
Around one-fifth of respondents were consistently negative about the criminal justice system and crime levels. Those who were consistently negative were more likely to be Māori or Asian, a female aged 25–49, have a household income under $70,000 per year, and have only high school or no formal qualifications. In contrast, those who were consistently positive were more likely to be male, European, hold a university degree, have a household income over $100,000 per year, and live in the Wellington metro area.

New Zealanders' perceptions of safety differ from those perceived internationally. In 2010 and 2011, New Zealand topped the Global Peace Index issued by the Institute for Economics and Peace – out of 149 countries. The index is based on 23 indicators including corruption, violence, crime rates, military spending and access to primary education.  According to the 2009 Corruption Perceptions Index by Transparency International, New Zealand is the least corrupt nation in the world. New Zealand's approach to deterrence and remedy of white-collar crime, brought to widespread public attention after 1992 with the Renshaw Edwards and the Equiticorp cases. As financial crime can be complex (e.g. blue-collar, white-collar, fraud, tax evasion), lawyers were involved in shady deals of the cases, and New Zealand set a precedent by levying a fee of ten thousand dollars on all senior lawyers of the NZ Law Society, raising NZD$28,000,000, which served both the victims of white-collar crime and public awareness.

Characteristics of victims 
A victim survey undertaken in 1996 found that 67% of the population were not aware of being subject to any criminal activity, 14% suffered from two or more criminal offences, and 4% had been the victim of five or more criminal activities.

Ethnicity
The New Zealand Crime and Safety Survey conducted in 2006 showed that Māori have a much higher risk of victimisation than other groups. The figures showed that each year around 47% of Māori were victims of crime and Māori were also more likely to be victimised multiple times (4.3 incidents per victim compared with 2.7 for European victims). The risk of victimisation for Māori was particularly high for serious offences, including sexual violence and violence by partners.  For example, 8% of Māori women experienced sexual victimisation – twice as high as the national rate for women (4%).

Analysis of the 2006 New Zealand Crime and Safety Survey showed that a number of factors contribute to the high rate of victimisation of certain groups of Māori over other Māori. These included being young, being on a benefit, being single, living in a sole-parent household, living in neighbourhoods with high social disorder and being female. The survey also showed that offences involving violence by strangers and damage to property were less likely to be reported and that four in ten Māori were unable to name any community service that was available for victims.

The 2019 Crime and Victims Survey found that the higher victimisation rates for Māori, when controlled for both age and the level of deprivation, were not statistically significant. This suggests that the higher victimisation rates are partly a result of the high proportions of young Māori and the overrepresentation of Māori in high deprivation areas.

Characteristics of offenders

Gender
The 2014 the large majority of crime in New Zealand that was prosecuted was committed by males. In 2014, just under 33,000 females were apprehended by police compared to 122,800 males, a ratio of one female to 3.72 males.

Ethnicity
New Zealand's crime statistics are compounded by the over-representation of Māori. Despite Māori making up only 16% of the general population, figures show 42% of all criminal apprehensions involve a person identifying as Māori, as do 51% of those in prison. In November 2019 the police launched a campaign to reduce Māori re-offending, as 51% of those in prison were Māori. For Māori women, the picture is even more acute: they comprise around 60% of the female prison population. A report by the Corrections Department says: "The figures lend themselves to extremist interpretations: at one end, some accuse the criminal justice system of being brutally racist, as either intentionally or unintentionally destructive to the interests and well-being of Māori as a people. At the other, there are those who dismiss the entire Māori race as constitutionally 'criminally inclined'." The justice sector's 2014 Briefing to the Incoming Government named the over-representation of Māori as one of the sector's main challenges.

The drivers of crime 
A forum held at Parliament in 2009 on the Drivers of Crime in New Zealand identified mainly socio-economic factors contributing to crime such as: "Family dysfunction; child maltreatment; poor educational achievement; harmful drinking and drug use; poor mental health; severe behavioural problems among children and young people; and the intergenerational transmission of criminal behaviour." The forum noted that "Many of these issues are concentrated within socially and economically disadvantaged families and communities." In New Zealand, it seems these life circumstances are more likely to affect Māori families than non-Māori– which contributes to the comparatively high rates of offending by Māori. 
In 2010 the Law Commission released a report on the social destruction caused by alcohol in New Zealand and quoted district court judges who said that 80% of all offending in New Zealand occurred under the influence of alcohol and drugs.

Addressing the drivers of crime 
In 2009, following the Drivers of Crime forum, the National led Government established four priority areas to reduce crime in New Zealand. This included improving support for maternity services and early parenting, addressing conduct and behavioural problems in childhood, reducing the social destruction caused by alcohol (and increasing treatment options for problem drinkers), and improving the management of low-level repeat offenders.

Improving support for maternity services and early parenting is considered important because conduct and behavioural problems in childhood are an important predictor of later chronic antisocial behaviour, including crime. Interventions the National led Government has adopted in this area include increasing the number of intensive case workers to support vulnerable teenage parents and attempts to improve participation in early childhood education.

Addressing conduct and behavioural problems in young children is also important. The Justice Department says if early intervention with the five to ten per cent of children with the most severe conduct and behavioural problems is effective, this has the potential to reduce subsequent adult criminal activity by 50 to 70 per cent. A key government proposal in this area is the establishment of programmes to strengthen positive behaviour and reduce bullying at school. In 2008 three-quarters of primary school children reported being bullied, ranking New Zealand second worst out of 35 countries in a major international study.

To address the harm caused by alcohol, the Government asked the Law Commission to conduct a comprehensive investigation into New Zealand's liquor legislation. The Commission received thousands of submissions and their investigation took over two years leading to the release of a 500-page in-depth report: Alcohol in Our Lives: Curbing the Harm.  The Government incorporated many of the less important recommendations made by the Commission into the Alcohol Reform Bill. However, the Bill was widely criticised by health professionals for failing to address six key evidenced-based recommendations put forward by the Commission. The six included raising the price, making the extra revenue available for the treatment of problem drinkers, banning television and radio advertising of alcohol, reducing trading hours of bars and clubs, reducing the number of outlets allowed to sell alcohol and raising the purchase age back to 20 years. A NZ Herald on-line survey showed 80% of respondents thought the Government's reforms were a 'token gesture' or 'could be stricter'.

When the issue of the purchase age reached the floor of parliament in August 2012, MPs voted to keep the purchase age at 18. Around the same time, Justice Minister Judith Collins also revealed she had dumped a ban on ready-to-drink alcoholic beverages over six percent alcohol content. After meeting with liquor industry representatives, Collins agreed to allow the liquor industry to make its own regulations on RTD's instead.

Rates of imprisonment 

The number of sentenced prisoners has varied over recent years, reaching a high of 9,333 in 2006 and falling to 7,662 in 2014. Over half of those sentenced to prison in 2014 were sentenced to terms of less than 12 months. As of 2016, New Zealand's prison population rate was 202 per 100,000 people which was the 69th highest in the world.

Prison sentencing rates have increased over the years. In 1984, 4.7 percent of offenders sentenced and convicted were given imprisonment; this rose to 7.1 percent in 1994 and 9.7 percent in 2002, when the current sentencing legislation (the Sentencing Act 2002) was enacted. From 2002, prison sentence rates rose to a high of 11.5 percent in 2005 then fell to 8.5 percent in 2008, before increasing again to 13.3 percent in 2015.

Factors contributing to rates of imprisonment 
In New Zealand, as in most western democracies, the rate at which people are sent to prison primarily depends on trends in penal policy and sentencing law, in particular laws affecting the availability of community-based sentence options for judges, the use of remand, and the maximum length of sentences for any given offence. Penal policy is inevitably affected by the prevailing political climate. Indeed, Professor John Pratt of Victoria University in Wellington says that while crime is driven primarily by socio-economic factors, the growing rate of imprisonment in Western countries has been driven by penal populism – a process whereby the major political parties compete with each to be "tough on crime" by proposing laws which create longer sentences and increase the use of remand prior to sentencing. The news media contribute to penal populism by sensationalising violent crime.

In July 2009 Dame Sian Elias, the Chief Justice, argued against what she described as the "punitive and knee-jerk" responses to crime because of its potential consequences for prison overcrowding. In a controversial speech to the Wellington District Law Society, she called for a more rational approach to penal policy and said the focus on victims had made courtrooms "very angry places" and had put at risk the impartial system of deciding criminal blame.  She also said that if action to address the growing prison population was not taken, Government might be pushed into the use of executive amnesties to reduce the growing prison population. In response, Minister of Justice Simon Power said "The Government is elected to set sentencing policy. Judges are appointed to apply it."

Capital punishment

Capital punishment was practiced in New Zealand from 1840 until its abolition in 1989, although the last execution took place in 1957. The country executed 85 people, all by hanging. All but one person were executed for murder, and all but one person executed were male.

See also
Corruption in New Zealand
Gangs in New Zealand
List of countries by incarceration rate
Terrorism in New Zealand
Violence against women in New Zealand
Cannabis in New Zealand
Speed limits in New Zealand
Abortion in New Zealand 
Gun laws in New Zealand
Legal aid in New Zealand
Female genital mutilation in New Zealand
Forced marriage in New Zealand
Prostitution in New Zealand
Prisoners' rights in New Zealand
Unreasonable search and seizure in New Zealand
Capital punishment in New Zealand
Child abuse in New Zealand
Blasphemy law in New Zealand
Presumption of supply in New Zealand
Litter in New Zealand
Alcohol in New Zealand
Censorship in New Zealand

Organisations
Howard League for Penal Reform Canterbury
Neighbourhood Support
Sensible Sentencing Trust

Notes

References

Further reading

Criminal legislation

External links
New Zealand Police
Statistics New Zealand – Crime and justice page
New Zealand Criminal Markets 
Rethinking Crime and Punishment organisation